Craig Donald Garner (born 12 July 1971 in Porirua, New Zealand) is a former New Zealand cricketer who played ten first-class matches for the Central Districts Stags in the 1990s and he also played for Nelson in the Hawke Cup.

References

1971 births
Living people
New Zealand cricketers
Central Districts cricketers
Cricketers from Porirua